Epeorus sylvicola is a species of mayfly belonging to the family Heptageniidae.

The species is found in Europe and Western Asia. The larvae typically inhabit fast flowing waters and have rigid gill plates.

References

Mayflies
Insects described in 1865
Insects of Europe
Insects of Western Asia